() is a Tamil poetic work belonging to the Eighteen Lesser Texts (Patinenkilkanakku) anthology of Tamil literature, belonging to the 'post Sangam period' corresponding to between 100 and 500 CE.  contains 154 poems written by the poet Kanimeytaviyar.

The poems of  deals with the subjective concepts.  in the Sangam literature denotes the subject matters that deal with the intangibles of life such as human emotions, love, separation, lovers' quarrels, etc. The five landscapes of Sangam poetry are  – forest,  – mountains,  – farmland,  – arid land and  – seashore.

References
 Mudaliyar, Singaravelu A., Apithana Cintamani, An encyclopaedia of Tamil Literature, (1931) - Reprinted by Asian Educational Services, New Delhi (1983)
 http://tamilnation.org/literature/ 
 http://tamilnation.org/literature/pathinen/pm0056.pdf Tinaimalai Nurraimpatu eText at Project madurai

Sangam literature